Charles Agar may refer to:

 Charles Agar (cricketer) (1877–1921), English cricketer
 Charles Agar (politician) (1882–1961), farmer and political figure in Saskatchewan, Canada
 Charles Agar, 1st Earl of Normanton (1736–1809), Anglo-Irish Protestant clergyman, Archbishop of Dublin, 1801–1809
 Charles Agar (Archdeacon of Emly) (1755–1789), Irish Anglican priest
 Charles Agar (rugby league), rugby league footballer of the 1910s and 1920s for Wakefield Trinity

See also
 Charles d'Agar (1669–1723), French painter